Dr. Adil Athanasio Surrur is a South Sudanese scientist and politician. He has served as Minister of Education, Science and Technology of Western Bahr el Ghazal since 18 May 2010.

References

South Sudanese politicians
Living people
People from Western Bahr el Ghazal
Year of birth missing (living people)
Place of birth missing (living people)
South Sudanese scientists